Manao Temple is a former Buddhist temple located in Xihu District of Hangzhou, Zhejiang.

History
Manao Temple was first established in 946, during the Later Jin dynasty (936–947). In 1065, it was officially called "Manao Temple". It was named for its location in the Manao Slope. In 1152, in the Southern Song dynasty (1127–1279), the temple relocated to the current location. During the region of Qianlong Emperor (1736–1795) of the Qing dynasty (1644–1911), he visited the temple three times. Manao Temple was restored in the Tongzhi period (1862–1874).

In 1926-27, Taiwanese historian Lian Heng lived here. In December 2008, it was used as the Lian Heng Memorial Museum. It is no longer used as a religious building.

Architecture
The present temple was completed in 1921 by abbot Qingjie. Along the central axis of the temple stand three buildings including the Shanmen, Mahavira Hall and Rear Hall. Subsidiary structures were built on both sides of the central axis including wing-room, dining room and bedroom.

Gallery

References

Buddhist temples in Hangzhou
Buildings and structures in Hangzhou
Tourist attractions in Hangzhou
20th-century establishments in China
20th-century Buddhist temples
Religious buildings and structures completed in 1152